is a railway station on the Hokuriku Railroad Ishikawa Line in Hakusan, Ishikawa, Japan, operated by the private railway operator Hokuriku Railroad (Hokutetsu).

Lines

Station layout
The station consists of two side platforms serving two tracks. The station is staffed.

Adjacent stations

History
Tsurugi Station opened on 22 June 1915.

Passenger statistics
In fiscal 2011, the station was used by an average of 830 passengers daily.

Surrounding area
 Tsurugi Town Office
 Tsurugi High School
 Tsurugi Junior High School
 Tsurugi Post Office
 Kaga Hakusan Bus Headquarters

 Ishikawa Prefectural Route 45
 Ishikawa Prefectural Route 179

See also
 List of railway stations in Japan

References

External links

 Tsurugi Station information 

Railway stations in Ishikawa Prefecture
Railway stations in Japan opened in 1915
Hokuriku Railroad Ishikawa Line
Hakusan, Ishikawa